Jaguar is a 1979 Filipino film noir directed by Lino Brocka. It was entered into the 1980 Cannes Film Festival. The story is based on the real-life "Brown Derby Shooting" in 1960 as documented by Quijano de Manila in the article "The Boy Who Wanted to Become Society", later republished in the non-fiction crime anthology, Reportage on Crime (1977).

Cast
 Phillip Salvador as Poldo Miranda
 Amy Austria as Cristy Montes
 Menggie Cobarrubias as Sonny Gaston
 Anita Linda as Mother
 Johnny Delgado as Direk San Pedro
 Mario Escudero as Mang Berto
 Jimmy Santos
 Gigi Salvador as Apple
 Joel Lamangan as Press
 Roi Vinzon as Edmon

See also
 Kisapmata
 Bayan Ko: Kapit sa Patalim
 Orapronobis
 Manila

References

External links

1979 films
1979 drama films
Films directed by Lino Brocka
Philippine drama films
1970s English-language films